Thomas Allen Heath is an American musician best known as the lead singer, rhythm guitarist, and occasional keyboardist of the band Tommy Tutone, who are most famous for their 1981 single, "867-5309/Jenny." A common misconception is that "Tommy Tutone" is Heath's stage name, rather than the name of the band. The band was originally known as "Tommy and the Tu-tones", which was shortened to "Tommy Tutone". Heath left the band after the release of their third album, 1983's National Emotion. In 1994, Heath released the album Nervous Love under the Tommy Tutone name, but without the involvement of any of the other original band members.

Heath later became a computer analyst and software engineer and moved to Portland, Oregon. He married his girlfriend, Lisa Scholtz, on June 9, 2008 while on vacation in Lake Tahoe, California.

References

Living people
American male singers
Musicians from Portland, Oregon
Musicians from Santa Rosa, California
Singers from California
Singers from Oregon
Guitarists from California
20th-century American guitarists
American male guitarists
20th-century American male musicians
Year of birth missing (living people)